Panduro may refer to:

 Panduro, Bolivia, a canton in the province of Aroma, La Paz Department
 Elna Panduro (1882–1983), Danish actress
 Lorenzo Hervás y Panduro (1735–1809), Spanish Jesuit and philologist
 Leif Panduro (1923–1977), Danish novelist and dramatist

See also
 Pandura, an ancient string instrument